Lieutenant Albert Rene Chabrier (1896-1920) was a French World War I flying ace credited with six aerial victories.

Biography

Albert René Chabrier was born on 24 May 1896 in Briare, France. His earlier service during World War I is unclear; however, he was posted to Escadrille 315 on 9 November 1917. He was credited with six aerial victories during 1918. He was awarded the Croix de Guerre with four palmes during his service.

Chabrier was killed in an aviation accident on 18 January 1920, in Peru.

Sources of information

Reference
 Franks, Norman; Bailey, Frank (1993). Over the Front: The Complete Record of the Fighter Aces and Units of the United States and French Air Services, 1914–1918. London, UK: Grub Street Publishing. .

1896 births
1920 deaths
French World War I flying aces
Victims of aviation accidents or incidents in Peru